Adam Wright (1975-1998) was an Australian professional rugby league footballer for the South Sydney Rabbitohs in the National Rugby League competition. His position of choice was as a prop.

Background
He was born in Sydney, New South Wales, Australia to Robert (Bobby) and Barbara. He grew up in Haberfield in the inner west of Sydney.

Wright was shot and killed outside of the Five Dock Hotel on 17 July 1998. Organised crime figure Michael Kanaan was convicted of Wright's murder and sentenced to life imprisonment.

References

Australian rugby league players
Australian murder victims
South Sydney Rabbitohs players
1998 deaths
1975 births
Rugby league players from Sydney
Deaths by firearm in New South Wales
People murdered in New South Wales